Lok Bawan is a village in Doru Tehsil in Anantnag district in the Indian union territory of Jammu and Kashmir. It is one of 62 villages in Doru block along with villages like Panzat Wan, Pora and Bronthnu

References

Villages in Anantnag district